Donald Lee Troy (March 2, 1927 – July 31, 2006), nicknamed "California Kid", was an American Negro league pitcher for the Baltimore Elite Giants in 1944 and 1945.

A native of Los Angeles, California, Troy broke into the Elite Giants' starting rotation in 1947 as a 17-year-old. He died in Hilo, Hawaii in 2006 at age 79.

References

External links
 and Seamheads
 Donald Troy at Negro Leagues Baseball Museum

1927 births
2006 deaths
Baltimore Elite Giants players
Baseball pitchers
Baseball players from Los Angeles
20th-century African-American sportspeople
21st-century African-American people